Frost and Fire is the debut album by the American heavy metal band Cirith Ungol. Its music is generally faster and more simplistic than that of King of the Dead, which saw the band begin to adopt a doom metal style influenced heavily by power metal.

Album information 
Frost and Fire was produced by Cirith Ungol and originally self-released through the band's own record label—Liquid Flames Productions—in 1981. The album was re-released later that year by Enigma Records, re-released again along with King of the Dead on one CD by One Way Records in 1995, and finally re-released again in September 1999 on Metal Blade Records. A bootleg picture disc version of this LP, limited to 500 hand-numbered copies, also exists. While Michael "Flint" Vujejia is credited as the bass player on this album, it has been confirmed in several interviews that Greg Lindstrom was actually the bassist on this album.
In Brazil the lp Frost and Fire was released with the cover of the King of the Dead. (1985).

Critical reception 

In 2005, Frost and Fire was ranked number 362 in Rock Hard magazine's book of The 500 Greatest Rock & Metal Albums of All Time.

Track listing 
All songs written by Greg Lindstrom. The seventh track, "Maybe That's Why", is an instrumental, however, lyrics were included for the song on the inner sleeve of the original vinyl release.

Personnel 
Cirith Ungol
Tim Baker – lead and backing vocals
Jerry Fogle – guitars
Greg Lindstrom – guitars, synthesizers, e-bow, backing vocals, bass (uncredited)
Michael "Flint" Vujea – bass
Robert Garven – drums, backing vocals

Production
Tim Nelson – engineer
Allen Zentz – mastering
Randall L. Jackson – executive producer

References 

1981 albums
Cirith Ungol albums
Albums with cover art by Michael Whelan